Traute, Princess of Lippe (born Traute Becker, 16 February 1925 – 25 February 2023) was a German princess, philanthropist, and biologist. She was a patron of the visual arts, the Princess Pauline Foundation, the City of Detmold, and the District of Lippe. She was the bearer of the Federal Cross of Merit. She was awarded a Crown Cross in gold from the Diakonisches Werk in recognition of her social work.

Born in Hänigsen, Lower Saxony, Traute was the daughter of Charlotte Meyer and Gustave Becker. She earned a doctorate in biology. Traute married Armin, Prince of Lippe, in Göttingen, where they first met, on 27 March 1953. He was head of the Princely House of Lippe.

In 1959, Traute gave birth to their son Stephan, Prince of Lippe. She was regularly seen walking around Detmold with Prince Armin and their dog, a Scottish terrier until Armin predeceased her in 2015. They were married for 62 years, and had five grandchildren.

Princess Traute of Lippe was a board member of the Princess Pauline Foundation from 1979 to 2000 and served as chairman from 1983 to 1995. She was a founding member of the Lippische Gesellschaft für Kunst, along with Prince Armin, and served as its honorary chairman from 2016. In 2015, she also took over patronage of the MS-Kontaktkreis, a multiple sclerosis support group, following the death of Prince Armin and hosted its annual visit to Detmold Castle.

Princess Traute died on 25 February 2023, at the age of 98.

Publications 
 Traute Prinzessin zur Lippe (1991). "Zur Geschichte der Paulinen Anstalt". Heimatland Lippe (ini German). (3):81–89.

References

External links 
 A Portrait: Dr. Traute zur Lippe by Lippische Landeszeitung (YouTube)

1925 births
2023 deaths
House of Lippe
Princesses of Lippe